Sesotho verbs are words in the language that signify the action or state of a substantive, and are brought into agreement with it using the subjectival concord. This definition excludes imperatives and infinitives, which are respectively interjectives and class 14 nouns.

In the Bantu languages, verbs often form the centre of a complex web of regular derivational patterns, and words/roots belonging to many parts of speech may be directly or indirectly derived from them. Not only may new verbs be derived using a large number of derivational suffixes, nouns (and, iteratively, the other parts of speech that derive from them), some imperative interjectives and, to a lesser extent, ideophones may be formed by simple morphological devices.

Varieties

Verb stems may be divided into four varieties:
Regular stems beginning with a consonant and ending in a vowel
Monosyllabic verbs
Vowel verb stems begin with a vowel
Derived verbs constructed from other verbs, noun roots, adjectival roots, and ideophones by suffixes.

Regular verbs are those beginning with a consonant and ending in the vowel . The final  may change into every vowel except the near-close back vowel through inflexion or derivation. The verb root is the atomic part of the verb, which does not change (save for some purely phonetic changes) and Bantu languages share numerous similar verb roots (with predictable sound changes between languages).

 Stem  see, from root , also existing as isiZulu -bon-, Swahili -on-, Tshivenda -vhon-, Chishona -von-, Chilamba -won- etc. Proto-Bantu *-bon-

Monosyllabic stems may be classified into several categories:
  come ⇒ Perfect , Causative , Passive 
  go ⇒ Perfect , Causative , Passive 
  draw water ⇒ Perfect , Causative , Passive 
 The e-stems have a typical near-close front  in their derivatives
  burn ⇒ Perfect , Causative , Passive 
  eat ⇒ Perfect , Causative , Passive 
 The "velar" e-stems have labialized onsets, and have similar forms to other e-stems but have a near-close back vowel  in the passive
  drink ⇒ Perfect , Causative , Passive 
The first two of these verbs are very common among the Bantu languages
  say ⇒ Perfect , No causative, Passive 
  be; very restricted in use (only used in the participial sub-mood of certain copulatives)
  say so ⇒ Perfect  / , No causative, No passive

Vowel verb stems are conjugated as regular verbs but are put into a separate class due to being uncommon in Bantu languages (and, in some languages but not in Sesotho, causing changes to concords and other formatives prefixed to them). Class 1 and 5 nouns derived from these verbs do not cause any velarization to the prefix. The Proto-Bantu reconstructions of many of these verbs suggests that they originally began with *g (or sometimes *j), which "protected" the vowel.
  avoid (as a taboo)
  travel
  hear, sense
  construct
  strike, punish

Tones

Verbs fall into only two categories when it comes to their tones: L verbs and H verbs. The difference lies in whether the "underlying tone" of the verb's first syllable is high or null (under-specified). Thus, all verbs of a certain length in the same tonal category are pronounced with similar tonal patterns under the same grammatical circumstances.

What the verbal tone system lacks in variety, however, it more than makes up for in complexity. The tones of the syllables of the verbs regularly change under varying grammatical environments, with the high tones being manipulated by "tonal rules", and the tones associated with certain syllables being changed by numerous "tonal melodies."

Verbal derivatives

Various derivatives may (recursively) be formed from verbs by means of several suffixes (called "extensions"). Each derived verb is as much an authentic verb as the original.

In the following sections, "polysyllabic" generally means "of more than two syllables."

Verbs are derived primarily through suffixes, some of which are no longer productive ("dead").

The passive indicates that the subject is acted upon by the agent, just like the "passive voice" in English. The agent is indicated by the copulative prefix  although passives may also be used idiomatically without an agent.

The following rules are applied to form the passive:
 The long passive is formed simply by changing the final  to 
  mould ⇒  be moulded
 Many verbs accept the short passive suffix by simply becoming labialized
  do ⇒  be done
  win ⇒  /  be won
  move slightly ⇒  be moved slightly
  give ⇒  be given
 Verbs ending in  replace it with 
  select, indicate ⇒  be selected
 Verbs ending in  replace it with 
  judge, condemn ⇒  be judged

It is very rare to have other verbs derived from the passive through suffixes.

This suffix has the effect of decreasing the valency of the verb and giving it an agentive import.

In the most formal standard language, the perfect of the passive is generally formed by inserting  before the final vowel of the perfect form (that is, the passive suffix has to come after the perfect suffix). In non-standard common speech, however, the perfect of the passive may alternatively be formed by using the long passive with the final vowel changed to the final vowel (usually ) of the verb's perfect.

The passive is used more commonly in Sesotho than the English "passive voice." Consider the following example:
 Sesotho (passive) , English (active) "Who will feed the dog?"

The alternatives are more complex in their respective languages:
 Sesotho (normal) , English (passive) "The dog will be fed by whom?"

Passive verbs are rare in the Niger–Congo family outside the Bantu sub-branch.

The neutro-active indicates an intransitive state without reference to the agent determining the condition. It can be approximated in English by using "get" or "become." It is, however, distinct from the passive. It indicates a current state of being done or being doable.

Only transitive verbs may take this suffix.
  accomplish ⇒;  (currently) get finished, take place
  do ⇒;  be done

This suffix has the effect of making the valency of the verb 0, even if the original verb had two objects. The resultant verb is completely intransitive and cannot assume any objects even if they are prefixed.

This extension is quite rare in the Bantu language family as a whole.

The neutro-passive indicates an intransitive state without reference to the agent determining the condition. It can be approximated in English by the suffix "-able." It is, however, distinct from the passive. It indicates that the verb has the potential of being doable, but not necessarily currently.

Only transitive vers may take this suffix.
  disperse ⇒;  be (potentially) spillable, become scattered
  do ⇒;  be doable, become done

This suffix has the effect of making the valency of the verb 0, even if the original verb had two objects. The resultant verb is completely intransitive and cannot assume any objects even if they are prefixed.

The applied indicates an action applied on behalf of or with regard to some object. It can be approximated in English by prepositions and prepositional phrases such as "for" and "towards."

The following rules apply when forming the applied:
 Usually one simply suffixes 
  to search for ⇒  search on behalf of
 Verbs ending in  replace it with 
  walk ⇒  walk on behalf of, towards
 Verbs ending in  preceded by an open vowel (or ) elide the middle  and contract to 
  write ⇒  write to/for
 Verbs ending in  preceded by a closed vowel (or ) don't contract
  grow ⇒  grow for/towards
  do ⇒  do for
  work ⇒;  work for

The applied increases the valency of verbs; intransitive verbs may become transitive in the applied, and transitive verbs may become doubly transitive
  live ⇒;  live for
  say something ⇒;  tell someone something (two objects)

The causative indicates an action caused to happen by some agent. It can be approximated in English by using "cause to."

The following rules apply when forming the causative. Most complications are caused by the original Proto-Bantu "short causative" *-î- being absorbed into the preceding consonant (Sesotho does not allow palatal glides):
 Usually one simply suffixes 
  do ⇒  cause to do
 Verbs ending in  replace it with 
  walk ⇒  cause to walk
  work ⇒  use
 Monosyllabic e-stems suffix  and i-stems suffix 
  drink ⇒  cause to drink
  see ⇒  show
  meet ⇒  join
This is also due to the Proto-Bantu short causative (Proto-Bantu *-k- + short causative *-î- + final *-a ⇒ *-kîa, which appears as Sesotho )
  go to graze ⇒  herd

Often the causative verb has a meaning implying "help to do"
  build ⇒;  help to build ⇒;  help each other to build ⇒;  neighbour (since traditionally neighbouring houses would share a wall and yard, which the owners would build together)

The causative may increase the valency of verbs
  know something ⇒;  cause someone to know something

Usually the perfect is formed by further suffixing , but if the derivation alveolarized an original final  to  then the alveolarization is reversed, resulting in final .

The intensive indicates intensity or quickness of action.

The suffix is simply a doubling of the causative suffix and the first syllable therefore follows similar phonetic rules as the causative. Sometimes, the suffix  is used instead, resulting in causative and intensive verbs looking the same.

  look for ⇒;  investigate, search thoroughly
  do ⇒;  do intensely

The perfective indicates an action that has been carried out to completion or perfection.

The suffix is simply a doubling of the applied suffix.

  step on ⇒;  oppress, coerce
  do ⇒;  do thoroughly

These verbs tend to denote meanings indicating specific purpose, and it is not unlikely that they are in fact intensifications of the applied suffix  instead (though the verb's valency is not increased).
  shout ⇒;  call out, scream
  obscure, screen ⇒;  protect

The reciprocal denotes a reciprocated action.

It is formed by suffixing  (Proto-Bantu *-an-).

It is usually used with plural subjects and plural concords, and has the effect of decreasing the valency. However, an object (the second subject) as well as a singular subject may still be used if the object is prefixed with the conjunctive enclitic  (and, with); that is, they have a conjunctive import
  speak ⇒;  cause to speak ⇒;  they communicate,  I communicate with him
  do ⇒;  do (to) each another

Often this suffix is used when there is no chance that two subjects are involved in reciprocating the action. In this case it simply converts the verb from transitive to conjunctive import, with a minor modification of meaning (the action is slightly extended in time, or indicates a habit of the actor)
  look at, search for ⇒;  /  I am looking for them (class 8 or 10 object)

The associative indicates that two or more subjects are associated together in the action of the verb.

It is formed by suffixing .

This derivative formation is not regularly used with most verbs.

  attach, hook ⇒;  be attached to each other, telecommunicate with one another
  do ⇒; ( (be done together)

The perfect simply replaces the final vowel with 

The reversive (or inversive) indicates an entire reversal of an action.

It is formed by suffixing  (Proto-Bantu *-udud-) although several other dead formations exist, showing two sets of derivations into intransitive, transitive, and causative. These extensions, or at least their short forms as found in other languages (Proto-Bantu intransitive *-uk- and transitive *-ud-), are sometimes called the "separative" instead.

  do ⇒;  undo

The augmentative is a largely dead formation signifying an augmentation or extension of a verb.

It is indicated by suffixes similar to the dead full formation of the reversive (and ).

  set apart ⇒;  be distinct

The extensive indicates performing the action repeatedly or extensively.

It is formed with the suffix  but is limited in scope. It is primarily used with verbs signify discrete actions, causing them to be continuous or habitual.

  jump ⇒;  prance about
  do ⇒;  do repeatedly

The perfect of this extension simply suffixes .

The diminutive indicates an action done "a little."

It is indicated by reduplication, the form being determined by the length of the verb:
 Disyllabic verbs repeat the entire stem
  do ⇒  do slightly
 Monosyllabic verbs are repeated with the near-close front vowel between the stems. This form is almost never used
  eat ⇒  eat a little
 Polysyllabic verbs duplicate the first two syllables of the stem
  find ⇒  find somewhat

Note that this derivation pattern, like all other uses of reduplication in Bantu languages, is also sometimes used to indicate an intensification and/or repetition of an action—in these cases the actual meaning must be determined from context.

After the reduplication, the new verb may only have an underlying high tone on the first syllable (that is, only the phones of the first syllable are repeated, but not its tone).

The positional is a dead stative formation found in many verbs, mostly indicating bodily positions.

It is marked by the suffix  (Proto-Bantu *-am-). Originally, this suffix was not used to derive new meanings as such, but rather to emphasise the stative positional nature of the verb.

Past tense may be indicated by multi-verbal conjugation.
  lie face downwards ⇒;  He is lying face down,  He did assume a lying position,  He was lying

The stative extensive is a dead stative formation found in a few miscellaneous verbs, united by the fact that they all indicate states.

It is marked by the suffix  (Proto-Bantu *-ad-). Originally, this suffix was not used to derive new meanings as such, but rather to emphasise the stative nature of the verb.

Past tense may be indicated by multi-verbal conjugation.
  wonder ⇒;  They are in awe,  They did become amazed,  They were amazed

The contactive is a dead formation found in a few verbs, all indicating touch or contact of some sort.

It is marked by the suffix  (Proto-Bantu *-at-). Originally, this suffix was not used to derive new meanings as such, but rather to emphasise or intensify the contactive nature of the verb.

Past tense may be indicated by multi-verbal conjugation.
  wear ⇒;  We are clothed,  We did become dressed,  We were dressed

Compounding of extensions

A verb may assume more than one extension, giving it a correspondingly more complex meaning.

  watch X ⇒; causative  cause Y to watch X ⇒; causative-applied  cause Y to watch X on behalf of Z ⇒; causative-applied-reciprocal  cause Y to watch X on behalf of each other

Though it may appear that the possibilities are endless, the truth is that the depth is limited by various factors. Apart from the obvious constraints of semantics (whether a complex meaning actually makes any sense and serves any possible purpose) and markedness (how strange and complex the verb sounds to the native speaker), there are also restrictions on the order of the extensions.

If an extension increases the valency of a verb, any objects of the original verb are demoted and the new object is made principal.

  I watch the fields ⇒;  I cause the children to watch the fields ⇒;  I cause the children to watch the fields on behalf of the old woman (highly marked)

If an objectival concord is used instead of an object, the concord agrees with what would have been the principal object. Additionally, if the original object was also only indicated by an objectival concord, then it becomes demoted to an absolute pronoun (Sesotho verbs may only have one objectival concord).

  I watch them ( fields) ⇒;  I cause them ( children) to watch them ⇒;  I cause them to watch them on behalf of her ( grandmother, old woman) (highly marked)
(Note how the infix  disappears when the verb is followed by a direct object, even if it is not the object indicated by the concord.)

Like all other Bantu languages, Sesotho has inherited certain restrictions on the order of the extensions. The most basic rule (which is broken by very few languages) is that the passive and the short causative always follow all the other extensions (including the perfect , which is always used with the final vowel ). Although it is probable that Proto-Bantu had fairly strict restrictions on the order of the other extensions, these rules have been relaxed somewhat in modern Bantu languages.

Various other unexpected palatalizations and alveolarizations brought on by combinations of the causative with other extensions may be similarly explained by the action of the short causative either replacing the normal causative, or being used together with the long causative around another extension (causative + other extension ⇒  + other extension + *-î- ⇒  + modified extension).

Certain extensions (intensive, perfective, associative, reversive, and augmentative) are obviously fossilised compound extensions. Often a derived verb may continue being used while the original verb disappears from the language.

Note that, since prefixes are of the shape CV or V (where C represents a consonant and V a vowel), verb roots end without the final vowel, prefixes are of the shape (VC)* (* indicates possible repetition) and the final vowel simply has shape V, this and other structures reinforce the open syllable structure of the Bantu languages, and very few languages have broken it.

Non-verbal derivatives

Verbs may also, to a lesser degree, be derived from nouns, qualificatives, and ideophones.

Denominative verbs are stative verbs derived from nouns and qualificatives.

  intelligence ⇒;  become intelligent
  soft (relative) ⇒;  become soft

The monosyllabic adjectival roots (except  some, and  four) become nasalized before assuming the suffix.
  ugly ⇒;  become ugly
  new ⇒;  become renewed
  beautiful ⇒;  become beautiful
  black ⇒;  become black

This extension (the long ) is quite rare in the Bantu languages, though all languages have a few verbs in this form even if it may no longer be active.

Deideophonic verbs are formed rather irregularly from disyllabic ideophones.

Additionally, the causative of the intransitive may be formed regularly with the suffix , but this is usually not done if the causative  form is regularly used.

  of turning over ⇒;  flip over, experience a car accident
  of being completely full ⇒;  burst open
  of picking up and throwing forward ⇒;  (of large herbivores) stand up and move in a certain direction, and  initiate a process or plan

When forming these verbs, the tone of the first syllable of the verb (its characteristic tone) corresponds to the tone of the first syllable of the part of the original word used to form the verb (usually the root, but a complete noun for monosyllabic roots). Thus verbs derived regularly from monosyllabic stems are all L verbs (due to the null toned prefix).

  easy, easyness [ _ _ ¯ ] ⇒;  become easy (L verb)
  angry, anger [ _ ¯ _ ] ⇒;  become angry (H verb)
  strong, strength [ _ _ ] ⇒;  become strong (L verb)

Inflexion during conjugation

In addition to the verbal derivatives, the following changes may occur to the stem's suffix , during conjugation:
The  changes to -e to form the perfect subjunctive tense and certain tenses of the negative conjugation. This vowel always causes the syllable carrying it to assume a high tone.
The  changes to -e to form the present-future tense of the subjunctive mood.
The  becomes  to form the plural of the imperative and certain relative tenses.
The  becomes  to form the perfect stem. Various phonological situations may change this basic construct.

The general rules for the formation of the perfect are varied due to various mostly phonological interactions with the suffix:
 Generally,  is suffixed
  buy ⇒  bought
 Verbs ending in  replace it with 
  go ⇒  went
 For monosyllabic stems, i-stems suffix  and e-stems suffix 
  drink ⇒  drank
 Disyllabic verbs ending in  change it to 
  send ⇒  sent
  wash ⇒  washed
  sing ⇒  sangand so forth...

For all verbs, however, the past tense may also be indicated with the simple  (past subjunctive) multi-verbal conjugation, although its meaning does diverge somewhat from that of the perfect (especially with stative verbs)
  They did sing

Conjugation

Verbal conjugation is by far the most complex and varied topic in the Bantu languages. The tenses are conjugated by means of prefixes and infixes indicating person, mood, implication, and aspect.

There are two conjugations, the positive and negative, and most tenses have corresponding forms in each. The language recognises four moods: the indicative, the subjunctive, the potential, and the participial sub-mood (infinitives are nouns and imperatives are interjectives). The moods may be divided into tenses according to time (remote past, immediate past, present, immediate future, and remote future) and implication (simple, progressive, and exclusive), which may be further subdivided according to aspect into indefinite, continuous, and perfect.

There are also many often complex compound tenses, indicated by changes in tone and the use of deficient verbs (multi-verbal conjugations).

Import refers to how the object of the verb is indicated.

Verbs can be either:
 Intransitive, with no direct object
  I become quiet
 Transitive, with a single direct object
  I thank you
 Ditransitive, with two objects
  I give my sibling food for the journey
 Locative, with a locative adverbial construction often indicated by  / 
  I enter my home
 Agentive verbs (usually passives), which need a copulative used as an agent adverb indicated by 
  They are helped by the dictionary
 Instrumental verbs, which use an instrumental adverb indicated by 
  We travel by car
 Conjunctive verbs (mostly reciprocals), which use the conjunctive proclitic 
  We agree with them

Many verbs can have more than one import ( (walk) can be locative, instrumental, or conjunctive;  (speak) can be intransitive, transitive, instrumental, or conjunctive) and verb derivatives can also change the import of the stem.

Many shades of meaning are achieved by the employment of deficient verbs in multi-verbal conjugations. Many tenses and moods may only be formed in this manner.

The verbal complex

In the Bantu languages, the typical full structure of verbs, excluding contractions, is as follows (the * indicates possible iteration):

In Sesotho, as with most other Bantu languages, this has been modified somewhat, resulting in the following structure ("I shall no longer look on his behalf"):

The verbal auxiliary infixes are used to indicate tense, certain forms of the subjunctive, progressive implication, the potential mood, as well verb focus in the present indicative tense. The verbal infixes always follow the simple infixes, though there are some instances where two simple infixes are used at the same time.

The extensions include suffixes used in verbal derivatives as well as the perfect  (which is always followed by the final vowel ).

With the exception of the verb root, each of these formatives is monosyllabic, but in Sesotho some verbal infixes (those that are contractions) and extensions (those that are obvious compoundings of earlier forms) also have more than one syllable.

Additionally, the structure (obj conc. + stem) is often called the "macrostem" in various syntactical and tonal theories.

Many aspects and tenses are indicated by multi-verbal conjugations and, with the exception of the subjectival concord, the root, and the final vowel, most of these formatives are not always necessary. Note that infinitives and imperatives (both of which do not have subjectival concords) may be considered separate parts of speech (nouns/gerunds and interjectives). Deficient verbs are never used with objectival concords, and the use of the other formatives with them is also limited.

This structure obviously ignores any possible enclitics that is suffixed.

Tenses

The Sesotho tense system is somewhat less complex (though not necessarily less complicated) than that of other Bantu languages. Whereas many Bantu languages clearly divide the time into remote past, immediate past, present, immediate future, and remote future, not all Sesotho moods divide very clearly between immediate and remote tenses, and the differences in meaning are not as great.

Moods

There are basically four moods.

The indicative mood indicates what is, was, or will be. It uses the basic subjectival concord.
The potential mood indicates that an action is possible. It uses similar concords to those of the subjunctive.
The participial sub-mood is so-called since it has forms corresponding to the tenses of both the above moods (most of the indicative, but only the present potential). It is widely used after certain conjunctives, in forming the complements of numerous multi-verbal tenses, and in the formation of relative clauses.
The subjunctive mood is used in subordinate or consecutive constructions, in many cases being parallel in usage to the Latin subjunctive.

Implication

Within the indicative and participial moods, tenses may be further sub-divided according to the implication of the action.

The simple implication indicates an action in no way qualified.
The progressive implication indicates an ongoing action.
The exclusive implication indicates an action that has not been happening until now.

Aspects

The tenses may be further divided according to the aspect of the action. In Sesotho there are at least three aspects, the definite, the continuous, and the perfect.

Deficient verbs

Deficient verbs, so called because they require a subordinate or complementary verb to complete their action, are used to form many tenses and to impart certain shades of meaning. They form part of multi-verbal conjugations consisting of a string of verbs, each with its own subjectival concord.

Deficient verbs, being "deficient", are never used alone. Many of them are irregular in form and have irregular inflexions. Monosyllabic deficient verbs are never used with the penultimate  that is sometimes used with normal verbs (not to be confused with the indefinite concord).

Many of these verbs seem radical in nature, while others (especially those with complex implications) are obviously derived from certain extant normal verbs (but are used with slightly different meanings). What distinguishes the deficient usage of these normal verbs is the fact that they are followed directly by another verb and affect its meaning (and only the main verb may carry an objectival concord).

  I no longer know
  I knew
  I shall (at some specific time) know
  I should/would have known
  I may indeed know
  I will at least know
  I may still know
  I nearly knew
  I shall no longer know
  I have to know

Notes

References

Coupez, A., Bastin, Y., and Mumba, E. 1998. Reconstructions lexicales bantoues 2 / Bantu lexical reconstructions 2. Tervuren: Musée royal de l’Afrique centrale.
de Schryver, G. M., and Prinsloo, D. J. 2000. Towards a sound lemmatisation strategy for the Bantu verb through the use of frequency-based tail slots — with special reference to Cilubà, Sepedi and Kiswahili. Makala ya kongamano la kimataifa Kiswahili 2000. Proceedings: 216–242, 372.
Doke C. M. 1963. Text Book of Zulu Grammar. Cape Town. 
Doke, C. M., and Mofokeng, S. M. 1974. Textbook of Southern Sotho Grammar. Cape Town: Longman Southern Africa, 3rd. impression. .
Downing, L.J, 2001. Tone (Non-) Transfer in Bantu Verbal Reduplication. Typology of African Prosodic Systems Workshop. Bielefeld University, Germany. 
Güldemann, T. The history of quotative predicates: Can lexical properties arise out of grammatical construction? 
Hyman, L. M. 2003. Segmental phonology. In D. Nurse & G. Philippson (eds.), The Bantu languages, pp. 42–58. London: Routledge/Curzon.
Hyman, L. M. 2007. Niger–Congo verb extensions: Overview and discussion. In D. L. Payne and J Pen̈a (eds.), Selected proceedings of the 37th Annual Conference on African Linguistics, 149-163. Somerville, MA: Cascadilla Proceedings Project.
Lodhi, A. Y. 2002. Verbal extensions in Bantu (the case of Swahili and Nyamwezi). In Africa & Asia, No 2, 2002, pp 4–26. Department of Oriental and African Languages, Göteborg University.

External links

Verbs
Verbs by language